The Hibernia mines are a series of iron mines in and around Rockaway Township, in Morris County, New Jersey, United States, that were worked from pre-Revolutionary times until 1916. Several companies operated mines in the area. An adit was constructed into the Hibernia hill  to move ore to the railhead of the Hibernia Railroad.

An exploratory shaft was drilled in the 1950s but was not worked, and the shafts and adit were partly or totally sealed in 1972 and 1989.

After its closure, the mine became the largest bat hibernaculum in New Jersey, with as many 30,000 bats each winter.  In 2010, less than 10% that number was found in the mine following an outbreak of white nose syndrome.

See also
 Morris Canal

References

External links
Photos of the Hibernia mine and other abandoned mines in New York and New Jersey
Hibernia Mine at mindat.org

Iron mines in the United States
Geography of Morris County, New Jersey
Underground mines in the United States
Mines in New Jersey
Rockaway Township, New Jersey